Michael Ferguson is an American Republican Party politician who served as a member of the Connecticut House of Representatives from the 138th district, which encompasses parts of Danbury, New Fairfield, and Ridgefield, from 2017 to 2019. Ferguson was first elected in 2016 over Democrat Jeff Tomchik. Ferguson was defeated in an upset victory by Democratic challenger Ken Gucker in 2018. He lost by just under 200 votes. Ferguson served as a member of both the Transportation Committee and the Education Committee while in the house.

References

Living people
Republican Party members of the Connecticut House of Representatives
Members of the Connecticut House of Representatives
People from Danbury, Connecticut
Connecticut Republicans
Year of birth missing (living people)